Melanie Raabe (born 1 August 1981 in Jena) is a German novelist and journalist.

Biography
Melanie Raabe was born in Jena, East Germany, and grew up in Wiehl. Her father was a visiting student from Benin.

She studied media science and literature at the University of Bochum. She then began a career in journalism.

In 2011, her short story The Tooth Fairy (dt. Die Zahnfee) won the top award of the German Short Crime Awards at the Tatort Eifel festival for crime literature. She self-published The Ugly Ones (dt. Die Hässlichen) as an e-book.

Her novel The Trap (dt. Die Falle) was released at the Leipzig Book Fair in 2015. The movie rights for The Trap were sold at the Berlinale to TriStar Pictures. The book won the Stuttgart Crime Fiction Prize the following year.

In 2016, her novel The Stranger (dt. Die Wahrheit) was published as an fiction book, radio play and audio book.

In 2018, Raabe released her novel The Shadow (dt. Der Schatten).

In 2019, her novel The Forests (dt. Die Wälder) was published under btb Verlag. She was nominated for the Shortlist Leo-Perutz Awards in the category Best new publication (crime novel) for The Shadow (dt. Der Schatten), but lost against Alex Beer (Daniela Larcher).

Works

Fiction

Radio plays

Audio books

Awards and nominations

References 

1981 births
Living people
Writers from Jena
People from Bezirk Gera
German crime fiction writers
21st-century German novelists
21st-century German journalists
Ruhr University Bochum alumni